Suhani Kalita (born 25 December 1991) is an Indian actress and model, who has appeared in Telugu,  Hindi, Malayalam and Bengali and few Bollywood films. She won Nandi Award for Best Child Actress for Hindustan - The Mother in 2000.

Early life 
Suhani is an alumnus of Rosary Convent High School in Hyderabad and St. Mary's Junior College and graduated from Aurora's University.

Career 
She modelled for designers like Sabyasachi Mukherjee. She has also represented brands like Neerus, RS Brothers, Samsung, Suraj Bhan Jewellers, DB Fashions, Kaasam Brothers, Saravana Stores, Videocon, Sisley and Airtel. She appeared in BSNL, Karvy Finances, and Idea Cellular print advertisements. She has also appeared in a few music videos.

She debuted in Bollywood in Kuch Tum Kaho Kuch Hum Kahein in a minor role. As of July 2007, she had appeared in over 45 films, 40 in Telugu, 5 in Hindi and each one in Bengali and Malayalam.

She also won the Best Debutant Award in the South Filmfare Awards 2007 and was nominated as the best Actress in Santhosham Awards.

Filmography

References

External links 
  (Not existing on 5 February 2021)
 

1991 births
Indian film actresses
Indian child actresses
Actresses in Tamil cinema
Actresses in Hindi cinema
Living people
Bengali people
Actresses from Hyderabad, India
Actresses in Telugu cinema
Actresses in Bengali cinema
Child actresses in Telugu cinema
20th-century Indian actresses
21st-century Indian actresses
Female models from Hyderabad, India